Artem Moroz (born 28 March 1984) is a Ukrainian rower. He competed in the Men's eight event at the 2012 Summer Olympics.

References

External links
 

1984 births
Living people
Ukrainian male rowers
Olympic rowers of Ukraine
Rowers at the 2012 Summer Olympics
People from Kamianske
Sportspeople from Dnipropetrovsk Oblast